Nyoni may refer to:

Places
Nyoni, Kenya, eastern Kenya
Samuel Nyoni, northern Malawi
Nyoni, Tanzania, southwestern Tanzania
Nyoni Garden, garden in Kampala, Uganda
Nyoni, KwaZulu-Natal, eastern South Africa

People
Erasto Nyoni (born 1988), Tanzanian footballer
Sithembiso Nyoni, Zimbabwean politician
Vuza Nyoni (born 1984), Zimbabwean footballer